The Delhi–Mumbai line is a major railway line in India. Mumbai Tejas-Rajdhani Express which is the fastest Tejas-Rajdhani Express travels on this line and covers the distance between Delhi and Mumbai in 15 hours and 40 minutes at a top speed of 160km/h and an average speed of 91 km/hr.

Details

This line is divided into three sections:
 New Delhi–Mathura section
 Mathura–Vadodara section
 Vadodara–Mumbai section

Electrification
The Delhi–Mumbai line was fully electrified by 1987.

Passenger movement
, Mathura, Kota, Ratlam, Vadodara,  and Mumbai Central, on this line, are amongst the top hundred booking stations of Indian Railway.

Line upgradation
The line is set to be upgraded for the trains to travel at a speed of 130 kmph. This will reduce the travel time between the two cities. In future the new generation trains such as Vande Bharat Express and Train 20 would also be able to run at a speed of 160 kmph.

Major trains
Mumbai Rajdhani Express
August Kranti Rajdhani Express
Thiruvananthapuram Rajdhani Express
Madgaon Rajdhani Express
Mumbai–New Delhi Duronto Express
Hazrat Nizamuddin–Pune Duronto Express
Bandra Terminus–Hazrat Nizamuddin Yuva Express
Bandra Terminus–Hazrat Nizamuddin Garib Rath Express
Amritsar Mumbai Central Golden Temple Mail
Paschim Express
Maharashtra Sampark Kranti Express
Goa Sampark Kranti Express
Kerala Sampark Kranti Express
Ernakulam–H.Nizamuddin Duronto Express

References

5 ft 6 in gauge railways in India
Rail transport in Delhi
Rail transport in Haryana
Rail transport in Uttar Pradesh
Rail transport in Rajasthan
Rail transport in Madhya Pradesh
Rail transport in Gujarat
Rail transport in Maharashtra